Count John II ʻwith the Helmetʼ of Nassau-Siegen (d. early May 1443), succeeded, with his brothers, his father in 1416 as Count of Nassau-Siegen (a part of the County of Nassau). With his brothers, he inherited the County of Vianden in 1417, and also inherited half of the County of Diez in 1420. He descended from the Ottonian Line of the House of Nassau.

Biography
John was the second son of Count John I of Nassau-Siegen and Countess .

With his brothers, Adolf I, Engelbert I and John III ʻthe Youngerʼ, John succeeded his father in 1416 as Count of Nassau-Siegen. They had already agreed on a joint continuation of the government on 21 December 1409. Whichever of the brothers would be native or closest to his lands on the fatherʼs death should take possession of them in all brothersʼ name until a division would have taken place. Whoever would take something for himself alone would be disinherited. All parental decrees favouring one brother over the other were declared null and void in advance. Adolf hereby tacitly renounced his right to the part of Nassau-Hadamar and the districts of Herborn, Haiger and Löhnberg, which he could have claimed in advance from the marriage contract with the heiress of the County of Diez. In accordance with this agreement, the brothers took over the government jointly after their fatherʼs death in 1416. However, the intended division did not take place: Adolf had no male offspring, the elder John was not married, the younger of the same name was a clergyman; it was to be expected that a division would not last long. Together, the brothers bought back the other half of the city of Siegen from the Electorate of Cologne.

When Elisabeth of Sponheim-Kreuznach, Countess of Vianden, died without issue in 1417, the four brothers, grandsons of Adelaide of Vianden, Elisabethʼs great-aunt, inherited the County of Vianden with the lordships of St. Vith, Bütgenbach, Dasburg and Grimbergen.

After the death of the eldest brother Adolf in 1420, the three remaining brothers succeeded him, but they lost half of the County of Diez, as well as ¼ of Camberg in 1428. The County of Nassau-Siegen was divided by the brothers; John obtained Dillenburg in this division.

John was invested with the Duchy of Cleves and the County of Mark by Roman King Sigismund in 1422, but settled for financial compensation two years later. Duke Adolf IV of Cleves paid him 12,000 gold guilders. In 1429 or 1439, the counts of Virneburg paid the brothers 21,000 gold guilders to buy off their claims to the heerlijkheid of Ravenstein with Herpen and Uden.

After the death of their youngest brother John III ʻthe Youngerʼ in 1430, John II and Engelbert I jointly ruled Nassau-Siegen, Vianden and Diez again.

John died unmarried at Dillenburg Castle in early May 1443 and was buried in  near Hilchenbach. He was succeeded by his nephews John IV and Henry II of Nassau-Siegen, the sons of Engelbert I.

Illegitimate children
John had two illegitimate children:
 Adelheid von Nassau, was a nun in Keppel Abbey in 1438.
 Tilman von Nassau, mentioned as student in Heidelberg in 1425, as student in Cologne in 1447, obtained  as a fief and a house in Herborn in 1461.

Ancestors

Notes

References

Sources
 
 
 
 
 
  (1882). Het vorstenhuis Oranje-Nassau. Van de vroegste tijden tot heden (in Dutch). Leiden: A.W. Sijthoff/Utrecht: J.L. Beijers.

External links
 Nassau. In: Medieval Lands. A prosopography of medieval European noble and royal families, by Charles Cawley.
 Nassau Part 4. In: An Online Gotha, by Paul Theroff.

|-

Nassau-Siegen, John 02
Counts of Diez
Counts of Nassau
Counts of Vianden
House of Nassau-Siegen
14th-century German nobility
15th-century German nobility
Year of birth unknown